Tula Governorate was an administrative division (a guberniya) of the Russian Empire and the Russian SFSR, located in the south of Moscow Governorate.

The Governate existed from 1796 to 1929; its seat was in the city of Tula. It was divided into twelve districts. The main towns were Alexin, Bogoroditsk, Byelev, Chern, Epifan, Efremov, Kashira, Krapivna, Novosil, Odoyev, Tula, and Venev.

Administrative division
Ufa Governorate consisted of the following uyezds (administrative centres in parentheses):
 Aleksinsky Uyezd (Aleksin)
 Belyovsky Uyezd (Belyov)
 Bogoroditsky Uyezd (Bogoroditsk)
 Venyovsky Uyezd (Venyov)
 Yepifansky Uyezd (Yepifan)
 Yefremovsky Uyezd (Yefremov)
 Kashirsky Uyezd (Kashira)
 Krapivensky Uyezd (Krapivna)
 Novosilsky Uyezd (Novosil)
 Odoyevsky Uyezd (Odoyev)
 Tulsky Uyezd (Tula)
 Chernsky Uyezd (Chern)

See also
 Tula Oblast

References

 
1796 establishments in the Russian Empire
States and territories disestablished in 1929
Governorates of the Russian Empire
Governorates of the Russian Soviet Federative Socialist Republic